Phlogophora is a genus of moths of the family Noctuidae first described by Georg Treitschke in 1825.

Species

 Phlogophora africarabica (Wiltshire, 1986)
 Phlogophora albifrons (Prout, 1928)
 Phlogophora albovittata (Moore, 1867)
 Phlogophora altitudinis (Viette, 1960)
 Phlogophora aureopuncta (Hampson, 1908)
 Phlogophora beata (Draudt, 1950)
 Phlogophora beatrix Butler, 1878
 Phlogophora burmana (Berio, 1972)
 Phlogophora cabrali Pinker, 1971
 Phlogophora calamistrata (Moore, 1882)
 Phlogophora camusi (Viette, 1967)
 Phlogophora chlorophragma (Prout, 1928)
 Phlogophora clava (Wileman, 1912)
 Phlogophora columbina (Draudt, 1950)
 Phlogophora conservuloides (Hampson, 1898)
 Phlogophora contrasta (Holloway, 1976)
 Phlogophora costalis (Moore, 1882)
 Phlogophora decorata (Moore, 1882)
 Phlogophora discalis (Warren, 1912)
 Phlogophora diseisignata (Moore, 1867)
 Phlogophora distorta (Moore, 1881)
 Phlogophora emphanes (Prout, 1926)
 Phlogophora furnasi Pinker, 1971
 Phlogophora fuscomarginata Leech, 1900
 Phlogophora gamma (Prout, 1925)
 Phlogophora gamoeensis (Prout, 1926)
 Phlogophora gustavssoni (Berio, 1972)
 Phlogophora humilis Hreblay & Ronkay, 1998
 Phlogophora illustrata (Graeser, 1889)
 Phlogophora interrupta (Hampson, 1908)
 Phlogophora inusitata (Saalmüller, 1891)
 Phlogophora iris Guenée, 1852
 Phlogophora ischnogramma (Prout, 1928)
 Phlogophora isoscelata (Prout, 1926)
 Phlogophora kinabalua (Holloway, 1976)
 Phlogophora kruegeri Saldaitis & Ivinskis, 2006
 Phlogophora latifascia (Prout, 1922)
 Phlogophora latilinea (Prout, 1928)
 Phlogophora leucomelas (Prout, 1928)
 Phlogophora lignosa (Holloway, 1976)
 Phlogophora magma (Holloway, 1976)
 Phlogophora malaisei (Berio, 1972)
 Phlogophora meticulodina (Draudt, 1950)
 Phlogophora meticulosa (Linnaeus, 1758) – angle shades 
 Phlogophora muluensis Holloway, 1989
 Phlogophora nigroplumbea (Warren, 1912)
 Phlogophora nobilis Hreblay & Ronkay, 1998
 Phlogophora pectinata (Warren, 1888)
 Phlogophora periculosa Guenée, 1852
 Phlogophora plumbeola (Hampson, 1894)
 Phlogophora pretiosa (Viette, 1960)
 Phlogophora retorta (Berio, 1955)
 Phlogophora rostrifera (Warren, 1912)
 Phlogophora scita (Hübner, 1790)
 Phlogophora sinuosa (Moore, 1881)
 Phlogophora sogai (Viette, 1960)
 Phlogophora striatovirens (Moore, 1867)
 Phlogophora styx (Holloway, 1976)
 Phlogophora subpurpurea Leech, 1900
 Phlogophora szecsenyii (Hreblay & Ronkay, 1998)
 Phlogophora triangula (Holloway, 1976)
 Phlogophora tricolor (Prout, 1928)
 Phlogophora tristictica (Berio, 1976)
 Phlogophora violacea (Berio, 1972)
 Phlogophora viridivena (Holloway, 1976)
 Phlogophora wollastoni Bethune-Baker, 1891

References

External links

Noctuinae
Taxa named by Georg Friedrich Treitschke
Noctuoidea genera